The Encyclopedia of New Jersey is edited by Maxine N. Lurie and Marc Mappen and contains around 3,000 original articles, along with 585 illustrations and 130 maps. The publication was overseen by an editorial board of experts in a variety of fields and edited by specialists in New Jersey history. It is the most definitive reference work ever published on the state.

External links
Official website

References

New Jersey culture
English-language encyclopedias
Rutgers University Press books